"All I See" is a song by A+. The song samples Shalamar's "This Is for the Lover in You".

Released as the lead single from The Latch-Key Child, it peaked at number 43 on the Hot Dance Music/Maxi-Singles Sales chart, number 29 on the Hot R&B/Hip-Hop Singles & Tracks, number 66 on the Billboard Hot 100 chart, where it stayed for 14 weeks and number 7 on the Hot Rap Songs chart. In addition, it made heavy rotation on MTV, BET and The Box.

Critical reception
Pete T. of Rapreviews.com called the song "aimed for a young and even female listenership but doesn't undermine the rest of the album; in fact, it's a rather likable track and a welcome display of versatility from the normally dark narrator".

References

1996 debut singles
1996 songs
A+ (rapper) songs
Universal Records singles
Songs written by Rodney Jerkins